Evdokiya Dimitrova Popadiynova (born 26 October 1996) is a Bulgarian professional footballer who plays as a forward for Italian Serie A club US Sassuolo and the Bulgaria women's national team.

Club career

Early years

Popadinova has played for Sportika Blagoevgrad in her home country before moving to England to sign with Bristol Academy. In doing so she is the first Bulgarian to make an appearance in the FA WSL. In March 2016, Popadinova signed with FA WSL 2 team London Bees.

College
In 2016, Popadinova enrolled at the University of Northwestern Ohio to play for their Division II NAIA program. Following two years with the Racers, Popadinova transferred to play with the Florida Gulf Coast Eagles in NCAA Division I. Ahead of her senior season, Popadinova was named on the MAC Hermann Trophy watchlist, one of only two players from her conference.

International career
At age 16, Popadinova made her senior debut for Bulgaria on 20 August 2013, coming on as a substitute to score in the 4–2 away win over Macedonia in a friendly match.

International goals

Awards

Individual
 Bulgarian Women Footballer of the Year (5): 2016, 2017, 2018, 2019, 2020
 WHAC Newcomer of the Year: 2016
 WHAC Offensive Player of the Year: 2017
 NAIA First Team All-American: 2016, 2017 
 ASUN Women's Soccer All-Decade Team (2010-19)

References

External links
 
 UNOH profile
 FGCU profile

1996 births
Living people
People from Hadzhidimovo
Bulgarian women's footballers
Women's association football forwards
Bristol Academy W.F.C. players
London Bees players
University of Northwestern Ohio alumni
College women's soccer players in the United States
Florida Gulf Coast Eagles women's soccer players
S.S.D. Napoli Femminile players
Women's Super League players
Serie A (women's football) players
Bulgaria women's international footballers
Bulgarian expatriate footballers
Bulgarian expatriate sportspeople in England
Expatriate women's footballers in England
Bulgarian expatriate sportspeople in the United States
Expatriate women's soccer players in the United States
Bulgarian expatriate sportspeople in Denmark
Expatriate women's footballers in Denmark
Bulgarian expatriate sportspeople in Italy
Expatriate women's footballers in Italy
Sportspeople from Blagoevgrad Province